Megachile nasica is a species of bee in the family Megachilidae. It was described by Morawitz in 1880.

References

Nasica
Insects described in 1880